Moel y Parc (sometimes written as Moel-y-Parc) is a hill on the border between Denbighshire and Flintshire in Wales. There is a television mast near the summit. The summit marks the boundary of Aberwheeler and Ysceifiog communities, and is the site of a cairn and tumulus.

External links
 www.hill-bagging.co.uk :Moel y Parc

Mountains and hills of Denbighshire
Country parks in Wales
Mountains and hills of Flintshire